Khedda is a 2022 Malayalam movie directed by Manoj Kana which got released in theaters on December 2, 2022, starring Asha Sharath, Uthara Sharath, Sudheer Karamana, Sudev Nair, Jolly Chirayath and Sarayu Mohan etc.

Cast
 Asha Sharath, 
 Uthara Sharath, 
 Sudheer Karamana 
 Sudev Nair 
 Jolly Chirayath 
 Sarayu Mohan

Reception
According to Mathrubhumi – Khedda is a movie which throw light to the question that how much safer are we using our smartphones?

According to Malayala Manorama – Khedda is a movie with a strong screenplay and the movie is talking about a relevant subject which the public must discuss. 

According to Asianet News - Khedda is a movie which talks about the life of people who gets into new generation traps

References

2020s Malayalam-language films